The Peace Project (also known as Christmas: The Peace Project) is an album by Australian contemporary worship group Hillsong Worship and is the fifth Christmas-themed worship album from Hillsong Music, following We Have a Saviour (2012). Released on 20 October 2017 by Hillsong Music Australia and Capitol Christian Music Group, the album's production was spearheaded by Ben Tan and Michael Guy Chislett. The album was nominated for the GMA Dove Award for Christmas / Special Event Album of the Year at the 49th Annual GMA Dove Awards.

Commercial performance 
In the United Kingdom, The Peace Project debuted at No. 4 on the Official Christian & Gospel Albums Chart dated 2 November 2017. It took the album seven weeks to reach No. 1, having registered at the top spot on the chart dated 14 December.

In the United States, The Peace Project debuted on the Billboard Christian Albums chart dated 11 November 2017, at No. 26. After two years and eight months since its release, the album made its debut at No. 122 on the all-genre Billboard 200 chart dated 29 June 2019, whilst peaking at No. 2 on the Christian Albums chart.

Track listing

Christmas: The Peace Project (Deluxe) 

On 26 October 2018, Hillsong Worship released a deluxe version of the album titled Christmas: The Peace Project (Deluxe), via Hillsong Music Australia and Capitol Christian Music Group in digital format.

Personnel 
Credits adapted from Tidal and Hillsong Zendesk

Vocals

 Taya Smith – lead vocals
 Brooke Ligertwood – lead vocals
 Aodhan King – lead vocals
 Benjamin Hastings – lead vocals
 Renee Sieff – lead vocals
 Michelle Cook – lead vocals, additional vocals
 Karina Wykes – lead vocals
 Marty Sampson – lead vocals
 Laura Toggs – lead vocals
 Matt Crocker – lead vocals
 Kris Hodge – lead vocals, additional vocals
 Melodie Wagner – additional vocals
 David Ware – additional vocals
 Dejsha Lollar – additional vocals
 John Davis – additional vocals
 Tanner Church – additional vocals
 Chelsea LaRosa – additional vocals
 Bella Taylor-Smith – additional vocals
 Dee Uluirewa – vocal coach

Technical, strings and horns

 Sam Gibson – mixing (tracks 1, 2, 3, 4, 6 and 7) (at Cardiff Creative Lab, UK)
 Ben Whincop – mixing (tracks 5, 8, 9, 10, 11 and 12) (at Sydney Australia), record engineer, bass
 Stephen Marcussen – mastering
 Stewart Whitmore – digital editing (at Marcussen Mastering, Hollywood, USA)
 Michael Guy Chislett – record engineer, electric guitar, acoustic guitar, programming
 Grant Konemann – record engineer, programming
 Ben Tan – record engineer, electric guitar, synthesizer, acoustic guitar, programming
 Chris Dennis – record engineer
 Phil Threlfall – record engineer (strings and horns)
 Oly Marian – assistant engineer
 Luke Klingensmith – assistant engineer
 Tyler Shields – assistant engineer
 Bo Bodnar – assistant engineer
 Jared Haschek – assistant engineer, string arrangements
 Michael Zuvella – additional engineering
 Omar Sierra – additional engineering
 Nate Balderston – additional engineering
 Rolf Wam Fjell – drums
 Daniel McMurray – drums, percussion
 Matt Tennikoff – bass
 Ben Tennikoff – piano, synthesizer, programming
 Dylan Thomas – piano, string arrangements, programming
 Daniel McMurray – piano
 Robbie Hellberg – piano, synthesizer
 Peter James – synthesizer
 Jack McGrath – synthesizer, programming
 Autumn Starra – synthesizer
 Freya Franzen – violin
 Zoe Friesberg – violin
 Imelda Yalcin – violin
 Harry Bennetts – violin
 Yena Choi – violin
 Lisa Reynolds – violin
 Lauren Brigden – viola
 Tom Higham – viola
 Ceridwen Davies – viola
 Will Clark – viola
 Liz Woolnough – viola
 Zoe Knighton – cello
 Tim Hennessy – cello
 Chloe Smith – double bass
 Josh Rogan – trumpets
 Henrik Beasy – trumpets
 Rob Shirley – French horn
 Rachel Shaw – French horn
 Saul Lewis – French horn
 Abbey Edlin – French horn
 Ian Bell – trombone
 Caleb Webb – trombone
 Megan Reeve – harp
 Simon Kobler – percussion, programming
 Brendan Tan – percussion, programming

Choir and ensemble

 Gloria Mati-Leifi – gospel ensemble
 Rachel Helms – gospel ensemble
 Dee Uluirewa – gospel ensemble
 Danniebelle Whippy – gospel ensemble
 Shekeinah Hill – gospel ensemble, choir coordinator
 Kris Hodge – gospel ensemble
 Taga Paa – gospel ensemble
 Rika Setu-Galo – gospel ensemble
 Jason Temu – gospel ensemble
 Lilly Saggin – children's choir
 Sienna Saggin – children's choir
 Harmony Saggin – children's choir
 Caleb Saggin – children's choir
 Mikayla McLean – children's choir
 Buddy McLean – children's choir
 Phoenix Andrew – children's choir
 Milla Andrew – children's choir
 Crosby Konemann – children's choir
 Elliott Guy Chislett – children's choir
 Alison Moore – children's choir coordinator
 Hillsong Choir – choir

Art & design
 Jay Argaet – art
 Nathan Cahyadi – art
 Nick Dellis – art
 Hillsong Communications – additional design

Admin

 Jill Casey – album administration
 Anthony Gomez – album administration
 Laura Kelly – album administration
 Alison Brown – album administration
 Steve Harmeling – album administration
 Chris Neal – album administration
 Josh Olson – album administration

Project handling and management

 Cassandra Langton – project direction
 Joel Houston – project direction
 Brooke Ligertwood – project direction
 Michael Guy Chislett – project direction
 Tim Whincop – project direction
 Steve McPherson – project direction
 Grant Thomson – project direction
 Jose Huergo – brand manager
 Matthew Capper – project manager
 Kris Hodge – assistant project manager

Production
 Ben Tan – producer
 Michael Guy Chislett – producer

Executive
 Brian Houston – global pastor (Hillsong Church)
 Bobbie Houston – global pastor (Hillsong Church)
 Cassandra Langton – global creative pastor (Hillsong Church)
 Rich Langton – global creative pastor (Hillsong Church)

Charts

Release history

Notes

References

External links 

Hillsong Music albums
2017 Christmas albums